The 2018–19 Turkish Airlines EuroLeague was the 19th season of the modern era of Euroleague Basketball and the eighth under the title sponsorship of the Turkish Airlines. Including the competition's previous incarnation as the FIBA Europe Champions Cup, this was the 62nd season of the premier competition for European men's clubs. 

The season started on 11 October 2018 and finished in May 2019 with the 2019 EuroLeague Final Four at Fernando Buesa Arena in Vitoria-Gasteiz, Spain. CSKA Moscow won the championship after defeating Anadolu Efes in the championship game.

Team allocation
A total of sixteen teams participated. The labels in the parentheses show how each team qualified for the place of its starting round (TH: EuroLeague title holders). Eleven teams were placed as Licensed Clubs, long-term licenses, while five spots were given to Associated Clubs, based on merit.
LC: Qualified as a licensed club with a long-term licence
1st, 2nd, etc.: League position after Playoffs
EC: EuroCup champion
WC: Wild card

Notes

Teams
A total of 16 teams from 9 countries contest the league, including 11 sides with a long-term licence from the 2017–18 season, 1 team qualified from the EuroCup and the 4 highest-placed teams from the ABA League, the German Bundesliga, the VTB United League and the Spanish ACB.

Bayern Munich and Budućnost VOLI qualified, after clinching the Bundesliga and ABA League titles respectively. Khimki qualified as runner-up of the VTB United League. Herbalife Gran Canaria qualified as the highest-placed team in the Liga ACB without a long-term EuroLeague licence. Darüşşafaka qualified as the EuroCup champions, after beating Lokomotiv Kuban in the Finals.

Venues and locations

Personnel and sponsorship

Managerial changes

Regular season

In the regular season, teams played against each other home and away in a round-robin format. The top eight teams advanced to the playoffs and the bottom eight teams were eliminated.

League table

Results

Playoffs

Playoffs series are best-of-five. The first team to win three games wins the series. A 2–2–1 format is used – teams with home-court advantage play games 1, 2, and 5 at home, while their opponents host games 3 and 4. Games 4 and 5 are only played if necessary. The four victorious teams advance to the Final Four.

Series

Final Four

The Final Four, held over a single weekend, is the last phase of the season. The four remaining teams play a single knockout round on Friday evening, with the two winners advancing to the championship game. Sunday starts with the third-place game, followed by the championship game. The Final Four was played at the Fernando Buesa Arena in Vitoria-Gasteiz, Spain on 17 and 19 May 2019.

Attendances

Average home attendances

Top 10

Panathinaikos game against Olympiacos was played with only 17,345 seats available for security reasons

Awards

EuroLeague MVP 
 Jan Veselý ( Fenerbahçe Beko)

EuroLeague Final Four MVP 
 Will Clyburn ( CSKA Moscow)

All-EuroLeague Teams

Alphonso Ford Top Scorer Trophy
  Mike James ( AX Armani Exchange Olimpia Milan)

Best Defender
  Edy Tavares ( Real Madrid)

Rising Star
  Goga Bitadze ( Budućnost VOLI)

MVP of the Round

Regular season

Playoffs

MVP of the Month

Statistics

Individual statistics

Rating

Source: EuroLeague

Points

Source: EuroLeague

Rebounds

Source: EuroLeague

Assists

Source: EuroLeague

Other statistics

Individual game highs

Team statistics

See also
2018–19 EuroCup Basketball
2018–19 Basketball Champions League
2018–19 FIBA Europe Cup

References

External links
Official website

EuroLeague seasons